Serra Branca Esporte Clube, commonly known as Serra Branca, is a Brazilian football club based in Serra Branca, Paraíba state.

History
The club was founded on July 13, 2007. Paraíba won the Campeonato Paraibano Second Level in 2011, finishing ahead of Flamengo Paraibano, thus gaining promotion to the 2012 Campeonato Paraibano First Level.

In 2022 the team changed his name to Serra Branca Esporte Clube.

Achievements
 Campeonato Paraibano Second Level:
 Winners (2): 2011, 2022

Stadium
Serra Branca Esporte Clube play their home games at Estádio Governador Ernani Sátyro, commonly known as Amigão. The stadium has a maximum capacity of 35,000 people.

References

Association football clubs established in 2007
Association football clubs established in 2022
Football clubs in Paraíba
2007 establishments in Brazil
2022 establishments in Brazil